Pat Hoed (born September 3, 1963 in Hollywood, California) is a singer, professional wrestling commentator and radio personality.  He has performed under the guises of Fantasma (currently as a live vocalist/studio bassist for Brujeria), Larry Rivera (formerly a color commentator for Xtreme Pro Wrestling (XPW)) and Adam Bomb (DJ for Final Countdown, a Hardcore radio show from 1983–1990). He was also featured in the song "Edgecrusher" on the album Obsolete with Fear Factory.

Discography
Brujeria - Matando Güeros (1993) - Backing Vocal/Bass
Brujeria - Raza Odiada (1995) - Backing Vocal/Bass
Brujeria - Brujerizmo (2000) - Backing Vocal/Bass
Asesino - Corridos de Muerte (2002) - Narrator/Interpreter of Brujeria newspiece video (computer-expanded bonus feature)

Videography
Best of Deathmatch Wrestling, Vol. 1 - Mexican Hardcore
Desperados del Ring, Vol. 1
Desperados del Ring, Vol. 2
Desperados del Ring, Vol. 3
XPW After the Fall
XPW Baptized in Blood
XPW Baptized in Blood 2
XPW Best of the Black Army
XPW Blown to Hell
XPW Damage Inc.
XPW Go Funk Yourself
XPW The Revolution Will Be Televised
XPW Retribution

References

1963 births
Living people
American male singers
Singers from California
American male professional wrestlers
People from Hollywood, Los Angeles
Death metal musicians
Brujeria (band) members